1527 Malmquista, provisional designation , is a stony Florian asteroid from the inner regions of the asteroid belt, approximately 10 kilometers in diameter.

It was discovered on 18 October 1939, by Finnish astronomer Yrjö Väisälä at Turku Observatory in Southwest Finland. It was named for the Swedish astronomer Gunnar Malmquist.

Orbit and classification 

Malmquista is a member of the Flora family, one of the largest families of stony asteroids in the main belt. It orbits the Sun in the inner main-belt at a distance of 1.8–2.7 AU once every 3 years and 4 months (1,214 days). Its orbit has an eccentricity of 0.20 and an inclination of 5° with respect to the ecliptic.

Physical characteristics

Rotation period 

In September 2002, a first rotational lightcurve of Malmquista was obtained from photometric observations by Stephen Brincat at Flarestar Observatory on the island of Malta. Lightcurve analysis gave a well-defined rotation period of 14.077 hours with a brightness variation of 0.60 magnitude. In September 2012, observations at the Palomar Transient Factory, California, gave a period of 14.044 hours and an amplitude of 0.42 magnitude.

Spin axis 

In 2013, an international study modeled a lightcurve with a period of 14.0591 hours and found a spin axis of (5.0°, 80.0°) in ecliptic coordinates (λ, β).

Diameter and albedo 

According to the survey carried out by NASA's Wide-field Infrared Survey Explorer with its subsequent NEOWISE mission, Malmquista measures between 9.55 and 10.338 kilometers in diameter and its surface has an albedo between 0.220 and 0.307. The Collaborative Asteroid Lightcurve Link assumes an albedo of 0.24 – derived from 8 Flora, a S-type asteroid and the family's largest member and namesake – and calculates a diameter of 10.80 kilometers with an absolute magnitude of 12.0.

Naming 

This minor planet was named after Swedish astronomer Gunnar Malmquist (1893–1982), director of the Uppsala Astronomical Observatory in Sweden. The official  was published by the Minor Planet Center in January 1956.

References

External links 
 Asteroid Lightcurve Database (LCDB), query form (info )
 Dictionary of Minor Planet Names, Google books
 Asteroids and comets rotation curves, CdR – Observatoire de Genève, Raoul Behrend
 Discovery Circumstances: Numbered Minor Planets (1)-(5000) – Minor Planet Center
 
 

001527
Discoveries by Yrjö Väisälä
Named minor planets
19391018